Minnesota State Highway 29 (MN 29) is a  highway in west-central Minnesota, which runs from its junction with U.S. Highways 59 and 212 in Montevideo and continues north to its terminus at U.S. Highway 71 in Wadena.

Route description
Highway 29 serves as a north–south route between Montevideo, Benson, Glenwood, Alexandria, and Wadena.

Highway 29 is built as a four-lane divided highway on the south side of Alexandria to Interstate Highway 94/US Highway 52.

Glacial Lakes State Park is located on Highway 29 in Pope County. The park is located South of Starbuck.

Lake Carlos State Park is located on Highway 29 in Douglas County. The park is located ten miles (16 km) north of Alexandria.

Highway 29 parallels U.S. Highway 71 throughout its route in west-central Minnesota.

The northern terminus for Highway 29 is its intersection with U.S. 71 in Wadena, three blocks south of U.S. 10.

History
Highway 29 was established November 2, 1920, traveling from Glenwood to Wadena. In 1923, the road was intermittently graveled; all graveling was completed by 1929.

A paved surface was applied to the roadway in stages from Alexandria to Parkers Prairie from 1926 through 1933. South of Alexandria, it was paved to the county line in 1931, and to a Northern Pacific railway crossing at Glenwood in 1933. Also in 1933, the highway was realigned between Deer Creek and Wadena, providing a shorter, more direct route.

In 1934, the route was extended south along former State Highway 38 from Starbuck south to U.S. 212 at Montevideo. This extension was paved between Montevideo and a point north of Benson, and gravel along the remainder.

Highway 38

Trunk Highway 38 was established November 2, 1920, traveling from Montevideo north to Starbuck. It was paved with concrete through Benson and several miles north and south of that town at the time it was marked. It was paved from Montevideo to the existing pavement south of Benson in 1931.

1934 onward
Highway 29 was paved from Parkers Prairie to Wadena in 1935.

The highway was realigned south of Starbuck in 1938 to eliminate a pair of sharp turns and paved from there to Highway 28, and then from that point south to the county line in 1940. After a replacement of the existing surface south of Alexandria in 1941, the highway was paved in its entirety.

When Interstate 94 was built through Douglas County in 1967, Highway 29 was upgraded to four lanes from the freeway north into Alexandria.

Major intersections

References

External links

Highway 29 at The Unofficial Minnesota Highways Page

029
Transportation in Chippewa County, Minnesota
Transportation in Swift County, Minnesota
Transportation in Pope County, Minnesota
Transportation in Douglas County, Minnesota
Transportation in Otter Tail County, Minnesota
Transportation in Wadena County, Minnesota